Jo Sung-ha (born August 8, 1966) is a South Korean actor. He is best known for his supporting roles in The Yellow Sea (2010), Helpless (2012), and Korean Peninsula (2012) and The K2 (2016).

Filmography

Film

Television series

Variety show

Web shows

Theater

Awards and nominations

References

External links
 
 
 
 

South Korean male film actors
South Korean male musical theatre actors
South Korean male television actors
South Korean Roman Catholics
1966 births
Living people
People from Ulsan
Seoul Institute of the Arts alumni